Manohar Gaju Joshi (born 2 December 1937) is a prominent politician from the state of Maharashtra. He was the Chief Minister of Maharashtra from 1995 to 1999 and Speaker of the Lok Sabha from 2002 to 2004. He is one of the prominent leaders of the Shiv Sena. He is also the one of the Indian to be elected to all of the four legislatures.

Background and family
Joshi was born on 2 December 1937 in the Marathi-speaking Deshastha Brahmin family of Gajanan Krishna Joshi and Saraswati Gajanan in Nandavi of Raigad district in Maharashtra. He received his Masters of Arts and LLB degrees from  Mumbai University. He married Anagha Joshi on 14 May 1964, with whom he has a son, Unmesh, and two daughters, Asmita and Namrata. His granddaughter, Sharvari Wagh, made her debut as an actress with the 2021 film Bunty Aur Babli 2.

Formation of Kohinoor 

After MA in law he joined Brihanmumbai Municipal Corporation (BMC) as an officer, but later started the Kohinoor technical/vocational training institute with the idea of an institute for semi–skilled youths to offer training as electrician, plumber, TV/radio/scooter repairman, photography. Eventually, he started multiple branches of Kohinoor in Mumbai, Pune, Nagpur, Nashik, etc., and later he made an entry in construction and another capital-oriented business.

Manohar Joshi also founded the Kohinoor Business School & Kohinoor-IMI School of Hospitality Management in Khandala, Maharashtra. Later on he took Chancellorship of Dnyaneshwar Vidyapeeth.

Political career

Early years 
He began his career by being elected to the Legislative Council from the Shiv Sena. He served three terms from 1972 till 1989. He became the Mayor of Mumbai during 1976 to 1977. He was elected to the Legislative Assembly from a Shiv Sena ticket in 1990.

Chief Minister 
He became the first non-Congress Chief Minister of Maharashtra when the Shiv Sena-Bharatiya Janata Party (BJP) coalition came to power in 1995. Technically, Sharad Pawar led the first non-Congress government in Maharashtra in 1978 as a member of Indian National Congress (Socialist).

Controversy and resignation 
Joshi and Bal Thackeray were explicitly named for inciting the Shivsainiks to violence against Muslims during the 1992–1993 riots in an inquiry ordered by the government of India, the Srikrishna Commission Report. However, Joshi, then a part of the BJP-Sena government called the report "anti-Hindu, pro-Muslim and biased" and refused to adopt the commission's recommendations.

As Chief Minister, he had permitted the release of a plot of land in Pune, reserved for a school, to a builder with ties to his son-in-law, Girish Vyas.  A housing complex, named Sundew, was built on that land by Vyas in 1998. Sustained legal efforts by Vijay Kumbhar, an RTI activist from Pune, led to Joshi's resignation in January 1999. In March 2009, Bombay High Court passed a verdict calling the housing complex illegal. The Supreme Court of India upheld the verdict in 2011 and fined Joshi Rs 15,000. Following its order, the building is now being used for a school.

Lok Sabha and Speaker 

He was promoted to the Lok Sabha when he won from Central Mumbai in the 1999 General Elections. He was the Speaker of the Lok Sabha from 2002 to 2004 during the National Democratic Alliance (NDA) administration.

He was elected for a six-year term to the Rajya Sabha on 20 March 2006 after being defeated in the previous Lok Sabha election from the Central Mumbai constituency.

National Legislator Conference 
 In September 2022, Manohar Joshi was appointed as a key patron of NLC Bharat.

See also
Manohar Joshi ministry
 List of Chief Ministers of Maharashtra

References

External links
 May 8, 2002 news article "Manohar Joshi to be next LS speaker" – Times of India
 Photos from site of Speaker of Lok Sabha

|-

|-

Chief Ministers of Maharashtra
Joshi, Manohar
Joshi, Manohar
Mayors of Mumbai
Marathi politicians
Speakers of the Lok Sabha
Rajya Sabha members from Maharashtra
Shiv Sena politicians
Members of the Maharashtra Legislative Council
India MPs 1999–2004
Politicians from Mumbai
Lok Sabha members from Maharashtra
Leaders of the Opposition in the Maharashtra Legislative Assembly